Afghan refugees are citizens of Afghanistan who were compelled to abandon their country as a result of major wars, persecution, torture or genocide. The 1978 Saur Revolution followed by the 1979 Soviet invasion marked the first wave of internal displacement and international migration from Afghanistan to neighboring Iran and Pakistan; smaller numbers also went to India or to the former Soviet Union. Between 1979 and 1992, more than 20% of Afghanistan's population fled the country as refugees. When the Soviet forces left Afghanistan in 1989, many began returning to their homeland. They again migrated to neighboring countries during and after the Afghan Civil War (1992–1996) but between 2002 and 2022 most have returned to Afghanistan.

Afghanistan became one of the largest refugee-producing countries in the world. Over 6 million Afghan refugees were residing in both Iran and Pakistan by 2000. Today, they are the third largest group after Syrian and Venezuelan refugees. Some countries that were part of the International Security Assistance Force (ISAF) established special programs to allow thousands of Afghans to resettle in North America or Europe. As stateless refugees or asylum seekers, they are protected by the well-established non-refoulement principle and the U.N. Convention Against Torture.

They receive the maximum government benefits and protections in countries such as Australia, Canada, Germany, the United Kingdom, and the United States. This allows them to travel with distinct United States passports. Australia provides a similar benefit to admitted refugees.

Internal displacement 
According to the International Organization for Migration (IOM), there are over five million internally displaced people in Afghanistan as of late 2021. Military actions and violence by the warring factions usually play a major part in the displacement, although there are also reasons of major natural disasters. The Soviet invasion caused approximately 2 million Afghans to be internally displaced, mostly from rural areas into urban areas. The Afghan Civil War (1992–1996) caused a new wave of internal displacement, with many citizens moving to northern areas in order to avoid the Taliban totalitarianism. Afghanistan has long suffered from insecurity and conflict, which has led to an increase in internal displacement.

Major host countries 

Native people of Afghanistan and their children lawfully reside in at least 96 countries around the world. About three in four Afghans have gone through internal and/or external displacement in their life. Unlike in certain other countries, all admitted refugees and those granted asylum in the United States are statutorily eligible for permanent residency (green card) and then U.S. nationality or U.S. citizenship. This extends their privileges, and gives all of them additional international protection against any unlawful threat or harm.

Pakistan 

Approximately 1,438,432 registered Afghan refugees and asylum seekers temporarily reside in Pakistan under the care and protection of the United Nations High Commissioner for Refugees (UNHCR). Of these, 58.1% reside and work in Khyber Pakhtunkhwa, 22.8% in Balochistan, 11.7% in Punjab, 4.6% in Sindh, 2.4% in the capital Islamabad and 0.3% in Azad Kashmir. Most were born and raised in Pakistan in the last four decades but are considered citizens of Afghanistan. They are free to return to Afghanistan under a voluntary repatriation program or move to any other country of the world and be firmly resettled there.

Since 2002, around 4.4 million Afghan citizens have been repatriated through the UNHCR from Pakistan to Afghanistan. Some members of the Taliban and their family have long been residing among the Afghan refugees in Pakistan. Others such as the Special Immigrant Visa (SIV) applicants and their family members, who are awaiting to be firmly settled in the United States, are also residing in Pakistan. Regarding the Taliban, Prime Minister of Pakistan stated the following:

Iran 

As of October 2020, there are 780,000 registered Afghan refugees and asylum seekers temporarily residing in Iran under the care and protection of the UNHCR. The majority of them were born in Iran during the last four decades but are still considered citizens of Afghanistan. According to Iranian officials, 2 million citizens of Afghanistan who have no legal documents and over half a million Iranian visa holders also reside in various parts of the country. Iran has long been used by Afghans to reach Turkey and then Europe where they apply for political asylum. As in Pakistan, the Afghan refugees are not firmly settled but reside there on a temporary basis.

Iran's initial response towards Afghan refugees, driven by religious solidarity, was an open door policy where Afghans in Iran had freedom of movement to travel or work in any city in addition to subsidies for propane, gasoline, certain food items and even health coverage. In the early 2000s, Iran's Bureau for Aliens and Foreign Immigrants Affairs (BAFIA) initiated registration of all foreigners, including refugees. It began issuing temporary residence cards to certain Afghans. In 2000, the Iranian government also initiated a joint repatriation program with the UNHCR. Laws were passed in order to encourage the repatriation of Afghan refugees, such as limits on employment, areas of residence, and access to services including education.

Other countries

Canada

When the Taliban seized control of Afghanistan in August 2021, the Canadian Government announced it would resettle 40,000 vulnerable Afghans such as women and girls, members of Afghanistan's LGBTQ community, human rights workers and journalists. This was in addition to an earlier initiative to resettle thousands of Afghans who had worked for the Canadian Government, such as interpreters and embassy employees, as well as their families. By March 2022, Canada resettled 8,580 Afghan refugees.  By August 2022, the first anniversary of the fall of Kabul, that number had risen to 17,375.

Uganda 
On 17 August, after the fall of Kabul, Ugandan Government announced that based on United States' request, they will be temporarily hosting 2000 Afghan refugees. The refugees were expected to be brought in batches of 500 to Entebbe where UNHCR has secured Imperial Hotels for their arrival and screening. The number of refugees currently residing in Uganda is unclear, but according to reports, Ugandan officials had confirmed the arrival of 145 refugees on Sunday, 22 August 2021. Another 51 Afghans were received at the Entebbe International Airport by the Government of the Republic of Uganda on 25 August 2021.

United States 

On 7 August, due to the threat from the Taliban, the US. Embassy Kabul announced to all American citizens living in Afghanistan to began evacuating themselves from the country and that all employees of the embassy leave immediately if "their function could be performed from elsewhere."

Although, the Department of State, on April 27, 2021, has ordered American Troops to withdraw from Afghanistan by September 11, it was not until early August 2021 that the security situation of Kabul deteriorated drastically. This was a time when Taliban militia were taking over Afghanistan one city and/or province at a time. On August 12, the US. Embassy Kabul issued a security alert directing all US citizen to leave Afghanistan immediately using commercial flights if they can, and if they could not afford it, they could contact the embassy to get information regarding repatriation loan.

On August 18, 2021, the Embassy issued another alert to US citizen and LPRs (lawful permanent residents) with their spouse and unmarried children to travel to the Hamid Karzai International Airport and enter the airport at Camp Sullivan. When news of this reached the ears of the many Afghan citizens trying to escape the rule of Taliban, they rushed to HKIA.

And thus began, the second phase of Operation Allies Refuge from 15 August to 31 August 2021. On August 21 and August 25, the US. Embassy once again issued security alerts advising US citizen to avoid travelling to the airport and to evacuate the Abbey Gate, East Gate and North Gate immediately.

On August 26, 2021, CNN reported two explosions at the HKIA that killed 13 US Marines and approximately 60 Afghans outside the airport walls.

The US admitted more than 10,000 Afghan refugees from the United Arab Emirates, which became a temporary host to them on behalf of other nations. However, nearly 12,000 refugees remained in the Abu Dhabi facility as of August 2022. Refugees began to protest the slow and opaque resettlement process and the living conditions. The protests resurfaced in October 2022. A refugee who moved to Canada said they are “psychologically suffering” in the Emirati facility.

Statistics
As shown in the chart below, Afghan refugees were admitted to other countries during the following periods:
 Soviet–Afghan War (1979–1989)
 Afghan Civil War (1992–96)
 Taliban Rule (1996–2001)
 War in Afghanistan (2001–2021)

Human rights abuses

Human rights abuses against admitted Afghan refugees and asylum seekers have been documented widely. This include mistreatment, persecution or torture in Pakistan, Iran, Turkey, Greece, Romania, Serbia, Hungary, Germany, the United States and in several other NATO-members states. Afghans living in Iran, for example, were deliberately restricted from attending public schools. As the price of citizenship for their family members, Afghan children as young as 14 were recruited to fight in Iraq and Syria for a six-month tour.

Afghan refugees were regularly denied visas to travel between countries to visit their family members, faced long delays (usually a few years) in processing of their visa applications to visit family members for purposes such as weddings, gravely ill family member, burial ceremonies, and university graduation ceremonies; potentially violating rights including free movement, right to family life and the right to an effective remedy. Racism, low wage jobs including below minimum wage jobs, lower than inflation rate salary increases, were commonly practiced in Europe and elsewhere. Unsanitary conditions have been reported at US air bases, and one Afghan refugee's online post of his food portion at Fort Bliss in 2021 drew some hateful responses. Many Afghan refugees were not permitted to visit their family members for a decade or two. Studies have shown abnormally high mental health issues and suicide rates among Afghan refugees and their children.

See also
International Organization for Migration (IOM)
United Nations High Commissioner for Refugees (UNHCR)
United States of Al (TV show about Afghan refugee residing with an American family)

References

Sources

External links
 Colombia to Host Afghans Making Their Way to the United States (U.S. News & World Report, Aug. 20, 2021)
 Afghanistan: Pakistan fences off from Afghan refugees (BBC News, Aug. 18, 2021)
 After 20 years of destruction, the US has a moral obligation to let in 1 million Afghan refugees (Business Insider, Aug. 16, 2021)
 Pakistan considers 'Iran model' to tackle Afghan refugee spillover (TRT World, July 20, 2021)
 Senate agrees to spend $2.1 billion on Capitol security and Afghan refugee aid (Washington Examiner, April 29, 2021)

 

Refugees by war